Mike Lee (born June 26, 1991) is former American football cornerback. He played college football at University of Massachusetts before transferring to Fort Valley State University, where he recorded 41 tackles (24 solo), three interceptions, and eight passes defensed during his senior season with the Wildcats. He was signed by the Atlanta Falcons as an undrafted free agent in 2015.

Professional career

Atlanta Falcons
Lee signed with the Atlanta Falcons as an undrafted free agent on May 10, 2015. He was waived by the Falcons on August 30, 2015.

Philadelphia Eagles
On November 30, 2015, Lee was signed to the Philadelphia Eagles' practice squad. He was released by the Eagles on December 15, 2015 but was re-signed the following day.

San Diego / Los Angeles Chargers
On August 22, 2016, Lee signed with the San Diego Chargers. He was waived by the Chargers on August 29, 2016. He was re-signed to the practice squad on November 9, 2016. He signed a reserve/future contract with the Chargers on January 3, 2017. He was waived by the Chargers on June 2, 2017.

References

External links
Fort Valley State Wildcats bio

1991 births
Living people
American football cornerbacks
Fort Valley State Wildcats football players
Atlanta Falcons players
Philadelphia Eagles players
San Diego Chargers players
Los Angeles Chargers players